The Manitoba U-18 'AAA' Hockey League (MU18HL), formerly the Manitoba Midget 'AAA' Hockey League, is an ice hockey league in the province of Manitoba, Canada. It is the highest level of minor hockey in the province. The league operates under the supervision of Hockey Manitoba.

History
The league was founded in 1985 and provides elite hockey players in Manitoba the opportunity to play at a high level of competition. The league is heavily scouted by the Western Hockey League, Junior 'A' teams, and NCAA programs. A number of players have gone to play in these leagues and the majority of Manitobans playing professional hockey have played in the 'AAA' league.

Teams
All teams are regionally based and are operated by Hockey Manitoba's regional minor hockey associations, with the exception of the Kenora Thistles, who are affiliated with Hockey Northwestern Ontario.  The Winnipeg region has the option to field multiple teams. Players for each of the teams are selected from the local minor hockey associations within their respective regions.

Former Teams

Parkland Stars (1985–87)
River East Royals (1985–87)
St. James Canadians (1985–87)
Winnipeg Stars (1986–87), Winnipeg Hawks (1987-03)
Winnipeg Monarchs (1985–89; 1992–94), Winnipeg Mavericks (1989–92)

League Champions
The league champion is awarded the Jack Forsyth Trophy, which is named after a former league commissioner.  The MU18HL playoffs are also to determine the provincial championship for Manitoba (teams based outside of Manitoba are not eligible for the Manitoba championship).

Notes

Telus Cup Playoffs
The Manitoba champion earns a berth to the West Regional Championship and competes against the champions from Saskatchewan and Northwestern Ontario.  The winner advances to the national Telus Cup, known as the Air Canada Cup until 2003 .

MU18HL teams have hosted the national championships three times: the Brandon Wheat Kings in 1994, the Winnipeg Thrashers in 2009 (in Selkirk), and the Kenora Stars in 2004. Winnipeg hosted the inaugural national championship in 1979, before the MU18HL was formed.

National Championship Appearances
1991 - Winnipeg Hawks representing West Region
1994 - Brandon Wheat Kings as host team
2004 - Kenora Stars as host team; Brandon Wheat Kings representing West Region Gold Medalist
2008 - Winnipeg Thrashers representing West Region Silver Medalist
2009 - Winnipeg Thrashers as host team
2011 - Winnipeg Thrashers representing West Region Gold Medalist

Alumni

National Hockey League Players

Other 
Corey Koskie, former Major League Baseball player
Daren Millard, sportscaster

References

External links
Manitoba AAA Midget Hockey League website
League Record Book

Hockey Manitoba
1985 establishments in Manitoba
Ice hockey leagues in Manitoba
Sports leagues established in 1985
Youth ice hockey leagues in Canada